A Ngulu is an execution sword used by the Bantu peoples (including the Ngombe, Doko, Ngala, etc.) of the Congo Basin.

Uses 
It resembles the Khopesh, the sickle-sword of ancient Egypt, except that it has a much more massive blade, made of iron, with a non-cutting back and a semi-circular concavity. The handle, often surrounded by metal wire, ended with two large wooden buttons and a smaller one. It could be one or two blades and was used for capital executions by beheading (the condemned was kept seated, head extended and attached to a branch).

History 
The Ngulu beheading was forbidden by the Belgians during the Free State of Congo period (1885-1908). The weapon, deprived of its function, took an even stronger symbolic and ceremonial value. From the 20th century, the Ngulu was worn during the ritual dance known as Likbeti, at the end of which the weapon was used to decapitate a goat whose flesh was then consumed by the whole tribe.

Gallery

References

Blade weapons
African weapons
Daggers
Knives